On the posterior surface of the femur, the intermediate ridge or pectineal line is continued to the base of the lesser trochanter and gives attachment to the pectineus muscle.

References 

Bones of the lower limb
Femur